Allan Le Nepveu (7 October 1927 – 22 February 2014) was an Australian rules footballer who played for the Hawthorn Football Club and St Kilda Football Club in the Victorian Football League (VFL).

Notes

External links 
		

1927 births
2014 deaths
Australian rules footballers from Victoria (Australia)
Hawthorn Football Club players
St Kilda Football Club players